Aksentyevskaya is a rural locality (a village) in Semizerye Rural Settlement, Kaduysky District, Vologda Oblast, Russia. The population was 16 as of 2002.

Geography 
Aksentyevskaya is located 63 km northwest of Kaduy (the district's administrative centre) by road. Preobrazhenskaya is the nearest rural locality.

References 

Rural localities in Kaduysky District